Bowling have been included as events since the 2007 Asian Indoor and Martial Arts Games.

Editions

Events

Medal table

References
2007 Asian Indoor and Martial Arts Games results
2009 Asian Indoor and Martial Arts Games results
2013 Asian Indoor and Martial Arts Games results
2017 Asian Indoor and Martial Arts Games results

External links
Asian Bowling Federation

 
Asian Indoor and Martial Arts Games
Bowling
Ten-pin bowling in Asia